Chobe may refer to:
 Chobe District
 Chobe River
 Chobe National Park